Dilyara Alakbar qizi Aliyeva (14 December 1929 – 19 April 1991), Ph.D., was an Azerbaijani philologist, translator and Women's rights activist and Member of Supreme Council of Azerbaijan from 1990–1991.

Family
Dilyara Aliyeva was born to the family of a blacksmith in Tbilisi, Georgia.

Education
She received secondary education in the local Azeri-language school. She studied Oriental studies at Baku State University. After receiving her B.A., she was admitted to a graduate program at the Nizami Institute of Language and Literature of the National Academy of Sciences of Azerbaijan from which she switched to the Rustaveli Institute of Literature of the Georgian Academy of Sciences. She worked on a dissertation on Reflection of Azerbaijani-Georgian literary relations in the literature of the XIX century and defended it in 1954.

Professional Activities
She later worked in several positions in the Nizami Institute studying the literary heritage of the Medieval poet Nizami and historical interactions and comparison between Azeri and Georgian literatures. Aliyeva became a senior researcher at the Institute and then head of the department of ancient and medieval literature. She was also a senior researcher in the department of literary relations and a senior researcher in the department of legal studies.

She was a member of the Writers' Union of Azerbaijan from 1960. In 1988 she received her Ph.D. in philology and joined the Azerbaijan Popular Front, where she soon became one of its executives.

Contribution
Dilara Aliyeva founded the Azerbaijan Association for the Protection of Women's Rights. She died on 19 April 1991 in a car crash (in which the philologist Aydin Mammadov was also killed) and was buried in Baku. A street in Baku and the association founded by Dilyara Aliyeva were named after her.

Works
Original publications in Azerbaijani:
 Azərbaycan-gürcü ədəbi əlaqələri tarixindən. (About the history of Azerbaijani-Georgian literary relations) Baku: Azərbaycan SSR EA nəşriyyatı, 1958, 174 pages.
 Ürəkbir, diləkbir. Baku: Yazıçı, 1981, 217 pages.

Translations
Aliyeva was also the author of several translations into Azerbaijani:

 Qardaşlar (hekayələr). (Brothers (stories)) Baku: Azərnəşr, 1972, 122 pages.
 Bir gecənin sevinci (hekayələr). (The joy of one night (stories)) Baku: Gənclik, 1977, 82 pages.
 Arçil Sulakauri. Aşağı-yuxarı (povest və hekayələr). (Archil Sulakauri, Up and down (narratives and stories)) Baku: 1978, 185 pages.
 Şota Rustaveli. Pələng dərisi geymiş pəhləvan. (Shota Rustaveli, The Knight in the Panther's Skin) Baku: Elm, 1978, 201 pages.
 Mixail Cavaxişvili. Torpaq çəkir. (Mikheil Javakhishvili, The ground draws) Baku: Yazıçı, 1980, 248 pages. (şərikli).
 İlya Çavçavadze. Dilənçinin hekayəti. (Ilia Chavchavadze, The story of the beggar) Baku: Yazıçı, 1987, 151 pages.
 Kür Xəzərə qovuşur (gürcü ədəbiyyatından seçmələr). (The Kura joins the Caspian (selections from Georgian literature)) Baku: Yazıçı, 1988, 383 pages. (şərikli).

See also
 Lists of writers
 Women in Azerbaijan
 Feminist history

References

1929 births
1991 deaths
20th-century Azerbaijani historians
Azerbaijani feminists
Azerbaijani politicians
Writers from Tbilisi
Georgian Azerbaijanis
Road incident deaths in Azerbaijan
Road incident deaths in the Soviet Union
Burials in Azerbaijan
20th-century Azerbaijani women writers
Women historians
20th-century Azerbaijani women politicians
20th-century Azerbaijani politicians
Burials at II Alley of Honor